"Same Ol' G" is a song by American R&B singer Ginuwine. It was written by Timbaland, Jimmy Douglass, and Static Major and recorded for the soundtrack of the American fantasy comedy film Dr. Dolittle (1998), with production helmed by the former. "Same Ol' G" describes Ginuwine having matured from his days of clubbing, drinking and thugging with friends as he now has his own album deal and appearing on television, but insists that he hasn't changed. Timbaland also contributed spoken adlibs throughout the song, primarily in between Ginuwine's sung verses.

Released as a single on July 28, 1998, it was later included on Ginuwine's second studio album 100% Ginuwine (1999), also serving as its lead single. While it did not chart officially on the Hot R&B Singles or the Hot 100 chart due to Billboard guidelines at the time, "Same Ol' G" was a top 20 R&B airplay hit on the strength of radio spins but charted on the lower reaches of the Hot 100 Airplay chart. A music video, directed by Dave Meyers, was also filmed.

Track listings

Credits and personnel
Credits lifted from the liner notes of 100% Ginuwine.

Jimmy Douglass – mixer, writer
Ginuwine – vocals
Static Major – writer
Timbaland – mixer, producer, writer

Charts

References
	

1998 singles
Ginuwine songs
Song recordings produced by Timbaland
Songs written by Static Major
Songs written by Timbaland
1998 songs
Atlantic Records singles